The 6th Army was an army level command of the German Army in World War I.  It was formed on mobilization in August 1914 from the IV Army Inspectorate.  The army was disbanded in 1919 during demobilization after the war.

History 
At the outbreak of World War I, command of the army was given to Rupprecht, Crown Prince of Bavaria (Kronprinz Rupprecht von Bayern).  The 6th Army initially consisted of the units of the Bavarian Army (which had retained military sovereignty after the unification of Germany), with some additional Prussian units. During the execution of Plan XVII, the 6th Army was stationed in the Central sector, covering Lorraine.

In August 1914, in the Battle of Lorraine, Rupprecht's 6th Army managed to hold against the French offensive, using a feigned withdrawal to lure the advancing armies onto prepared defensive positions.

After the Western Front turned to stalemate and the opposing forces formed lines of trenches, the 6th Army was based in Northern France. Most of the Bavarian units were gradually dispersed to other commands, with units from outside Bavaria joining the 6th Army. Nevertheless, command of the 6th Army remained with the Bavarian Crown Prince, who would eventually come to be regarded as one of Germany's most able generals.

On 24 September 1915 the 6th Army was the target for the British Army's first chlorine gas attack of the war. Despite the horrific casualties inflicted, the British offensive became bogged down after several days.

Rupprecht was promoted to the rank of field marshal (Generalfeldmarschall) in July 1916 and assumed command of Army Group Rupprecht on 28 August that year, consisting of the 1st, 2nd, 6th and 7th Armies.  Following Rupprecht's promotion, command of the 6th Army was given to General Ludwig von Falkenhausen.

In March 1917 the 6th Army was the target for the assault of the Canadian and British forces at the Battle of Vimy Ridge. The 6th Army under von Falkenhausen suffered over 20,000 casualties in the ensuing fighting and were pushed back from the ridge by the Canadian Corps.

At the end of the war it was serving as part of Heeresgruppe Kronprinz Rupprecht.

Order of Battle, August 1914, Lorraine 
For the Battle of Lorraine in August 1914, the 6th Army had the following composition:

Order of Battle, 30 October 1918 
By the end of the war, the 6th Army was organised as:

Commanders 
The 6th Army had the following commanders during its existence.

Glossary 
 Armee-Abteilung or Army Detachment in the sense of "something detached from an Army".  It is not under the command of an Army so is in itself a small Army.
 Armee-Gruppe or Army Group in the sense of a group within an Army and under its command, generally formed as a temporary measure for a specific task.
 Heeresgruppe or Army Group in the sense of a number of armies under a single commander.

See also 

 6th Army (Wehrmacht) for the equivalent formation in World War II
 German Army order of battle (1914)
 German Army order of battle, Western Front (1918)
 Schlieffen Plan

References

Bibliography 
 
 

06
Military units and formations established in 1914
Military units and formations disestablished in 1919